Phil Duprey (born February 6, 1944) is an American bobsledder. He competed at the 1968, 1972 and the 1976 Winter Olympics.

References

1944 births
Living people
American male bobsledders
Olympic bobsledders of the United States
Bobsledders at the 1968 Winter Olympics
Bobsledders at the 1972 Winter Olympics
Bobsledders at the 1976 Winter Olympics
People from Lake Placid, New York